J.League U-22 Selection (Jリーグ・アンダー22選抜) was a Japanese football team which played in J3 League from 2014 season to 2015 season.

Manager
2014-2015; Tsutomu Takahata

Player
Only players who played for the team in the match.

2014 season
Ryota Tanabe, Yuji Takahashi, Kazuki Mine, Yusuke Goto, Shuto Kono, Kazuki Sato, Naoya Fuji, Satoru Kashiwase, Andrew Kumagai, Takaaki Kinoshita, Ken Tajiri, Takaya Osanai, Sho Sato, Shohei Yokoyama, Riki Harakawa, Keita Fujimura, Yukitoshi Ito, Takaharu Nishino, Shinya Yajima, Ryota Suzuki, Musashi Suzuki, Ryuta Miyauchi, Haruya Ide, Shuhei Kawata, Sho Kagami, Tsubasa Suzuki, Ryosuke Maeda, Ayumi Niekawa, Daiki Kogure, Shogo Nakahara, Yuto Nagasaka, Naoki Kawaguchi, Yu Kimura, Gakuto Notsuda, Ryo Matsumura, Tatsuya Wada, Shuto Hira, Kazuki Kozuka, Hideyuki Nozawa, Takuya Kida, Yuta Toyokawa, Tsubasa Nihei, Hideki Ishige, Taishin Morikawa, Hiroki Akino, Yusuke Kobayashi, Naomichi Ueda, Tomoki Wada, Hiroto Nakagawa, Kengo Nagai, Kyohei Yoshino, Takuma Asano, Genki Yamada, Reo Mochizuki, Kenichi Tanimura, Shunta Awaka, Nikki Havenaar, Kosuke Nakamura, Genta Miura, Toru Takagiwa, Yuto Mori, Tomoya Koyamatsu, Yuto Uchida, Shota Kaneko, Masatoshi Ishida, Yuki Uchiyama, Keisuke Oyama, Ryosuke Tamura, Haruki Umemura, Tsuyoshi Miyaichi, Keita Ishii, Go Iwase, Naoki Ogawa, Koya Yuruki, Hiroyuki Mae, Yosei Otsu, Daiki Yagishita, Fumitaka Kitatani, Shinnosuke Hatanaka, Hayao Kawabe, Yuto Koizumi, Naoki Otani, Eiji Shirai, Shuhei Kamimura, Shota Fukuoka, Ado Onaiwu, Yuya Mitsunaga, Taro Sugimoto, Tasuku Hiraoka, Soya Takahashi, Ryota Aoki, Yohei Takaoka, Goson Sakai, Kazuya Miyahara, Shinnosuke Nakatani, Kenshin Yoshimaru, Yosuke Ideguchi, Koki Sugimori

2015 season
Ryota Oshima, Masatoshi Kushibiki, Ken Matsubara, Ryota Tanabe, Kazuki Mine, Ryosuke Yamanaka, Shuto Kono, Taisuke Mizuno, Kazuki Sato, Takumi Kiyomoto, Takaaki Kinoshita, Ken Tajiri, Takaya Osanai, Daichi Sugimoto, Sho Sato, Shota Sakaki, Kento Hashimoto, Keita Fujimura, Yukitoshi Ito, Takaharu Nishino, Takayuki Mae, Tatsuki Nara, Musashi Suzuki, Sho Kagami, Ryosuke Maeda, Ayumi Niekawa, Daiki Kogure, Shogo Nakahara, Yuto Nagasaka, Naoki Kawaguchi, Gakuto Notsuda, Takuya Iwanami, Tatsuya Wada, Daichi Akiyama, Hideyuki Nozawa, Takuya Kida, Shoya Nakajima, Yuta Toyokawa, Hideki Ishige, Hiroki Akino, Naomichi Ueda, Hiroto Nakagawa, Takuma Asano, Naoki Maeda, Junki Endo, Genki Yamada, Reo Mochizuki, Genta Miura, Toru Takagiwa, Kei Koizumi, Yuto Mori, Shota Kaneko, Masatoshi Ishida, Keisuke Oyama, Ryosuke Tamura, Tsuyoshi Miyaichi, Keita Ishii, Yosuke Tashiro, Koya Yuruki, Hiroyuki Mae, Yosei Otsu, Daiki Yagishita, Fumitaka Kitatani, Shinnosuke Hatanaka, Naoki Otani, Eiji Shirai, Tasuku Hiraoka, Soya Takahashi, Yohei Takaoka, Goson Sakai, Kazuya Miyahara, Shinnosuke Nakatani, Kenshin Yoshimaru, Ryuolivier Iwamoto, Masaya Okugawa, Takuma Mizutani, Yuma Suzuki, Takaya Inui, Natsuki Mugikura, Koki Oshima, Ryosuke Shindo, Taiga Maekawa, Kota Miyamoto, Ryoma Ishida, Masaki Sakamoto, So Hirao, Kazuma Takayama, Koya Kitagawa, Yuki Onishi, Daichi Kamada, Yosuke Ideguchi, Rikiya Uehara, Ko Matsubara, Masato Kojima, Kensei Nakashima, Rikiya Motegi, Shunsuke Motegi, Takuma Nishimura, Ryoya Ogawa, Hisashi Ohashi, Shota Saito, Daisuke Sakai, Ko Itakura, Itsuki Urata, Yuta Nakayama, Koji Miyoshi, Koki Sugimori, Takahiro Kunimoto

Club records

See also
Team America (NASL)
Pailan Arrows

References

External links
J.League

 
Defunct football clubs in Japan
J.League clubs
2014 establishments in Japan
2015 disestablishments in Japan
Association football clubs established in 2014
Association football clubs disestablished in 2015